In statistics, propagation of uncertainty (or propagation of error) is the effect of variables' uncertainties (or errors, more specifically random errors) on the uncertainty of a function based on them. When the variables are the values of experimental measurements they have uncertainties due to measurement limitations (e.g., instrument precision) which propagate due to the combination of variables in the function.

The uncertainty u can be expressed in a number of ways.
It may be defined by the absolute error . Uncertainties can also be defined by the relative error , which is usually written as a percentage.
Most commonly, the uncertainty on a quantity is quantified in terms of the standard deviation, which is the positive square root of the variance. The value of a quantity and its error are then expressed as an interval . 
However, the most general way of characterizing uncertainty is by specifying its probability distribution.
If the probability distribution of the variable is known or can be assumed, in theory it is possible to get any of its statistics. In particular, it is possible to derive confidence limits to describe the region within which the true value of the variable may be found. For example, the 68% confidence limits for a one-dimensional variable belonging to a normal distribution are approximately ± one standard deviation  from the central value , which means that the region  will cover the true value in roughly 68% of cases.

If the uncertainties are correlated then covariance must be taken into account. Correlation can arise from two different sources. First, the measurement errors may be correlated. Second, when the underlying values are correlated across a population, the uncertainties in the group averages will be correlated. 

In a general context where a nonlinear function modifies the uncertain parameters (correlated or not), the standard tools to propagate uncertainty, and infer resulting quantity probability distribution/statistics, are sampling techniques from the Monte Carlo method family. For very expensive data or complex functions, the calculation of the error propagation may be very expensive so that a surrogate model or a parallel computing strategy may be necessary.

In some particular cases, the uncertainty propagation calculation can be done through simplistic algebraic procedures. Some of these scenarios are described below.

Linear combinations
Let  be a set of m functions, which are linear combinations of  variables  with combination coefficients :

 

or in matrix notation,

 

 
 is the outer product.

Then, the variance–covariance matrix  of f is given by

In component notation, the equation

 

reads

 

This is the most general expression for the propagation of error from one set of variables onto another. When the errors on x are uncorrelated, the general expression simplifies to

 

where  is the variance of k-th element of the x vector.
Note that even though the errors on x may be uncorrelated, the errors on f are in general correlated; in other words, even if  is a diagonal matrix,  is in general a full matrix.

The general expressions for a scalar-valued function f are a little simpler (here a is a row vector):

 
 

 

In the case that the variables in x are uncorrelated, this simplifies further to

 

In the simple case of identical coefficients and variances, we find

 

For the arithmetic mean, the result is the standard error of the mean:

Non-linear combinations 

When f is a set of non-linear combination of the variables x, an interval propagation could be performed in order to compute intervals which contain all consistent values for the variables. In a probabilistic approach, the function f must usually be linearised by approximation to a first-order Taylor series expansion, though in some cases, exact formulae can be derived that do not depend on the expansion as is the case for the exact variance of products. The Taylor expansion would be:

where  denotes the partial derivative of fk with respect to the i-th variable, evaluated at the mean value of all components of vector x. Or in matrix notation,

where J is the Jacobian matrix. Since f0 is a constant it does not contribute to the error on f. In matrix notation,

 

That is, the Jacobian of the function is used to transform the rows and columns of the variance-covariance matrix of the argument.

Simplification 
Neglecting correlations or assuming independent variables yields a common formula among engineers and experimental scientists to calculate error propagation, the variance formula:

Specifically, the linear approximation of   has to be close to  inside a neighbourhood of radius .

Example 

now, taking variance on both sides, and using the formula for variance of a linear combination of variables:

hence:

In the particular case that , . Then

or

Then

Caveats and warnings
Error estimates for non-linear functions are biased on account of using a truncated series expansion. The extent of this bias depends on the nature of the function. For example, the bias on the error calculated for log(1+x) increases as x increases, since the expansion to x is a good approximation only when x is near zero.

For highly non-linear functions, there exist five categories of probabilistic approaches for uncertainty propagation; see Uncertainty quantification for details.

Reciprocal and shifted reciprocal

In the special case of the inverse or reciprocal , where  follows a standard normal distribution, the resulting distribution is a reciprocal standard normal distribution, and there is no definable variance.

However, in the slightly more general case of a shifted reciprocal function  for  following a general normal distribution, then mean and variance statistics do exist in a principal value sense, if the difference between the pole  and the mean  is real-valued.

Ratios

Ratios are also problematic; normal approximations exist under certain conditions.

Example formulae
This table shows the variances and standard deviations of simple functions of the real variables , with standard deviations  covariance , and correlation .

{| class="wikitable"
! style="background:#ffdead;" | Function !! style="background:#ffdead;" | Variance !! style="background:#ffdead;" | Standard Deviation
|-
| 
|| 
|| 
|-
| 
|| 
|| 
|-
| 
|| 
|| 
|-
| 
|| 
|| 
|-
| 
|| 
|| 
|-
| 
|| 
|| 
|-
| 
|| 
|| 
|-
| 
|| 
|| 
|-
| 
|| 
|| 
|-
| 
|| 
|| 
|-
| 
|| 
|| 
|-
| 
|| 
|| 
|-
| 
|| 
|| 
|-
|
|
|
|-
| 
|| 
|| 
|-
| 
|| 
|| 
|}

For uncorrelated variables expressions for more complicated functions can be derived by combining simpler functions. For example, repeated multiplication, assuming no correlation, gives

For the case  we also have Goodman's expression for the exact variance: for the uncorrelated case it is

 

and therefore we have:

Effect of correlation on differences
If A and B are uncorrelated, their difference A-B will have more variance than either of them. An increasing positive correlation will decrease the variance of the difference, converging to zero variance for perfectly correlated variables with the same variance. On the other hand, a negative correlation will further increase the variance of the difference, compared to the uncorrelated case.

For example, the self-subtraction f=A-A has zero variance  only if the variate is perfectly autocorrelated. If A is uncorrelated, then the output variance is twice the input variance, . And if A is perfectly anticorrelated, then the input variance is quadrupled in the output,  (notice  for f = aA - aA in the table above).

Example calculations

Inverse tangent function
We can calculate the uncertainty propagation for the inverse tangent function as an example of using partial derivatives to propagate error.

Define

Therefore, our propagated uncertainty is

where  is the absolute propagated uncertainty.

Resistance measurement
A practical application is an experiment in which one measures current, and voltage, on a resistor in order to determine the resistance, using Ohm's law, .

See also
 Accuracy and precision
 Automatic differentiation
 Bienaymé's identity
 Delta method
 Dilution of precision (navigation)
 Errors and residuals in statistics
 Experimental uncertainty analysis
 Interval finite element
 Measurement uncertainty
 Numerical stability
 Probability bounds analysis
 Significance arithmetic
 Uncertainty quantification
 Random-fuzzy variable
 Variance#Propagation

References

Further reading

External links
A detailed discussion of measurements and the propagation of uncertainty explaining the benefits of using error propagation formulas and Monte Carlo simulations instead of simple significance arithmetic
GUM, Guide to the Expression of Uncertainty in Measurement
EPFL An Introduction to Error Propagation, Derivation, Meaning and Examples of Cy = Fx Cx Fx'
uncertainties package, a program/library for transparently performing calculations with uncertainties (and error correlations).
soerp package, a Python program/library for transparently performing *second-order* calculations with uncertainties (and error correlations).

Uncertainty Calculator Propagate uncertainty for any expression

Algebra of random variables
Numerical analysis
Statistical approximations
Statistical deviation and dispersion